Canute R. Matson (April 9, 1843 – January 12, 1903) became Cook County Sheriff in the aftermath of the 1886 Haymarket Square Riot in Chicago.

Background
Knut Rognald Matson was born on the Opkvitne farm at Voss Parish in Hordaland, Norway.
He was the youngest child of Rognald Madson and Gjertrud Jonsdatter. He came to the United States with his parents and siblings in 1849 when he was 6 years old.  The Matson family settled in Walworth County, Wisconsin. Matson received his education at Albion College and later  studied law at Milton College.

Civil War
On October 7, 1861, he enlisted as a soldier in the 13th Wisconsin Volunteer Infantry Regiment, Company K, at Janesville, Wisconsin. During the Civil War, he was promoted  to sergeant and at the close of the war he was honorably discharged as a first lieutenant at San Antonio, Texas.

Political career
Starting during 1869, Matson took a leading part in the councils of the Illinois Republican Party. As a member of the state governor's staff and the Grand Army of the Republic, he was promoted first to major and later to colonel. He served as clerk of the Harrison Street Police Department and subsequently as a Justice of the Peace.  He was elected Cook County Coroner in 1880 as the nominee of the Republican Party.

In 1882, at the Cook County Republican convention, Seth Hanchett won the Republican nomination for Cook County sheriff over Matson, who was vying for the position. Hanchett would go on to win the general election.

During May 1886, while Matson was Deputy Sheriff of Cook County, the Haymarket Riot resulted in the death of several policemen. A number of arrests were made and charges were brought against eight men who were incarcerated in the Cook County Jail supervised by Matson. Later in 1886, he succeeded Seth Hanchett as Sheriff of Cook County.

He was a delegate from Illinois to 1888 Republican National Convention. In 1899, Matson was appointed superintendent of the Lincoln Park postal station, succeeding Hermann Lieb. At the time of his death,  Matson was the senior member of the law firm of Matson & Edwards in Chicago.

References

External links
August Spies letter to Cook County Sheriff Canute Matson, February 23, 1887
Canute R.  Matson, portrait photograph

1843 births
1903 deaths
Norwegian emigrants to the United States
People from Voss
Politicians from Chicago
Milton College alumni
Albion College alumni
People of Wisconsin in the American Civil War
Union Army officers
Sheriffs of Cook County, Illinois
Illinois lawyers
Illinois Republicans
Cook County Coroners
Grand Army of the Republic officials
Military personnel from Illinois